The 2011–12 Tijuana season was the 65th professional season of Mexico's top-flight football league. The season is split into two tournaments—the Torneo Apertura and the Torneo Clausura—each with identical formats and each contested by the same eighteen teams. Tijuana began their season on July 23, 2011 against Morelia, Tijuana play their homes games on Sundays at 12:00pm local time. This was Tijuana first season in Mexican top-flight league after defeating Irapuato in the promotion final.

Torneo Apertura

Squad

 (Captain)

Regular season

Apertura 2011 results

Goalscorers

Results

Results summary

Results by round

Transfers

In

Out

Torneo Clausura

Squad

 (Captain)

Out on loan

Regular season

Clausura 2012 results

Final phase

Monterrey advanced 4–3 on aggregate

Goalscorers

Regular season

Source:

Final phase

Results

Results summary

Results by round

References

2011–12 Primera División de México season
Mexican football clubs 2011–12 season
Association football in Tijuana
2011-12